Port Alsworth Airport  is a private-use airport serving Port Alsworth which is located in the Lake and Peninsula Borough of the U.S. state of Alaska. As per Federal Aviation Administration records, the airport had 2,634 passenger boardings (enplanements) in calendar year 2019, an increase of 52.87% from the 1,723 enplanements in 2018. 

Although many U.S. airports use the same three-letter location identifier for the FAA and IATA, this airport is assigned TPO by the FAA and PTA by the IATA.

Facilities and aircraft  
Port Alsworth Airport has one runway designated 6L/24R with a dirt and gravel surface measuring 3,000 by 100 feet (914 x 30 m). For the 12-month period ending September 5, 1984, the airport had 1,300 aircraft operations, an average of 108 per month: 81% air taxi and 19% general aviation. There are 25 aircraft based at this airport: 18 single-engine and 7 multi-engine.

It directly neighbors Wilder/Natwick Airport  which operates runway 6R/24L.

Airlines and destinations

References

External links 
 Lake And Peninsula Airlines
 Lake Clark Air
 Wilder/Natwick LLC Airport details
 Port Alsworth Airport details

Airports in Lake and Peninsula Borough, Alaska